The Head is a rural locality in the Southern Downs Region, Queensland, Australia. It borders New South Wales.

Geography 
The Condamine River rises in the north-east of the locality and flows through the locality exiting to the south-west (The Falls). This may be the origin of the name The Head.

Wilsons Peak is a neighbourhood with the locality.

History 
The neighbourhood of Wilsons Peak is named after the mountain peak of the same name, which in turn was named by Captain Patrick Logan, commandant of the Moreton Bay penal colony, probably after Captain Wilson, the Director of Public Works in New South Wales. The peak's Indigenous name is Jirramun.

Wilson's Peak State School opened on 23 August 1909 and closed on 1944. It was located at 1966 Condamine River Road. The site is now used as short-term holiday accommodation.

References 

Southern Downs Region
Localities in Queensland